The 1942 Wisconsin gubernatorial election was held on November 3, 1942.

Incumbent Republican Governor Julius P. Heil was defeated by Progressive nominee Orland S. Loomis in a rematch of the 1940 election with 49.65% of the vote.

Loomis died of a heart attack on December 7, 1942, a month before he was to take office. The Wisconsin Supreme Court ruled that Lieutenant Governor Walter Samuel Goodland would serve Orland Loomis's term as governor, overriding the view of Governor Julius Heil that he should continue in office.

Primary elections
Primary elections were held on September 15, 1942.

Democratic primary

Governor

Candidates
Raymond J. Cannon, former U.S. Representative
Joseph H. Conlin, concert singer
Stanley Z. Fajkowski, former tavern keeper
Gustav J. Keller, Democratic nominee for Attorney General of Wisconsin in 1940
William C. Sullivan, dentist, former mayor of Kaukauna
Albert J. Wilde, real estate broker

Results

Lieutenant Governor

Candidates
John M. Brophy, unsuccessful candidate for Wisconsin State Assembly in 1940

Results

Republican primary

Governor

Candidates
Julius P. Heil, incumbent governor
Milton T. Murray, state senator
James K. Robinson, dentist, unsuccessful candidate for Progressive nomination for lieutenant governor in 1936 and unsuccessful candidate for Republican nomination for governor in 1940

Results

Lieutenant Governor

Candidates
Walter Samuel Goodland, incumbent Lieutenant Governor
Charles I. Wesley, industrialist

Results

Progressive primary

Governor

Candidates
Orland S. Loomis, former Attorney General of Wisconsin and nominee for governor in 1940

Results

Lieutenant Governor

Candidates
Henry J. Berquist, Wisconsin State Assembly member
Philip E. Nelson, State Senator

Results

In the September Primary, Nelson won with a commanding 71% of the vote.  Nelson, however, had already been appointed to the federal War Production Board and, on the eve of the Progressive Party state convention, declined the nomination.  On October 5, the Progressives formally nominated Henry Berquist in place of Nelson.

Socialist primary

Governor

Candidates
Frank P. Zeidler, former county surveyor, member of the Milwaukee Board of School Directors

Results

Lieutenant Governor

Candidates
Arthur C. Ochsner, farmer

Results

General election

Governor
Major party candidates
William C. Sullivan, Democratic
Julius P. Heil, Republican
Orland S. Loomis, Progressive

Other candidates
Fred B. Blair, Independent Communist, Communist nominee for governor in 1932 and 1940 
Georgia Cozzini, Independent Socialist Labor
Frank P. Zeidler, Socialist, member of the Milwaukee Board of School Directors

Results

Lieutenant Governor
Major party candidates
John M. Brophy, Democratic
Walter Samuel Goodland, Republican
Henry J. Berquist, Progressive

Other candidates
Adolf Wiggert, Independent Socialist Labor, perennial candidate
Arthur C. Ochsner, Socialist

Results

Notes

References

Bibliography
 
 

1942
Wisconsin
Gubernatorial
November 1942 events